Matías Carlos Adrían Rueda (born 15 April 1988) is an Argentine professional boxer who challenged for the WBO featherweight title in 2016. At national level, he held the Argentine featherweight title from 2013 to 2016.

Professional career

WBO Latino Featherweight champion 
He won the title in the state of vacancy on 21 June 2013 to the noquear technically in the round 3 to the bonaerense Juan Ramón Solís in Merlo.

His first defence was on 9 August 2013 in front of Diego Tejerina litigates in which Rueda would win by TKO in the round 2.

His second defence was on 22 November 2014 in front of Gabriel Ovejero, fight that films won in the round 3 with a big KO.

His third defence was on 25 January 2015 in front of Guillermo Soloppi, fight that films won in the round 3 by KO with a hook to the liver.

His fourth defence was on 25 April 2015 in front of the Colombian Walter Estrada being this his second international fight, fight that films won with a TKO in the round 4.

His fifth defence was on 11 July 2015 in front of the Nicaraguan Jimmy Aburto in which wheel would finish retaining the title with a TKO in the round 5.

His sixth defense was 2 April 2016 to Néstor Paniagua, in which Rueda would emerge victorious by KO hook to the liver in round 3 in the city of Dolores.

ABF Argentine Featherweight title 
On 18 October 2013 conquest the Title ABF of the Weigh feather in state of vacancy in front of Diego Tejerina, fight that would win Wheel in the round 6 by nocaut technical.

On 8 March 2014 makes his first defence of the Title in front of Jorge Luis Rodríguez litigates that Rueda won by nocaut technical in the round 7.

South American Featherweight title 
On 16 January 2016 conquest the Title South American of the featherweight in state of vacancy in front of vacancy in front of Leandro Mendes Pinto, Rueda winning by knockout in the eighth round.

WBO Featherweight title
Rueda then faced #1 contender Oscar Valdez for the Vacant Wbo Featherweight title.Rueda was knocked out and hasnever been the same.

Professional boxing record

Recognitions
2015  World Boxing Organization Best Latin Boxer of the Year

References

External links

1988 births
Living people
Argentine male boxers
People from Tandil
Featherweight boxers
Sportspeople from Buenos Aires Province